Hermann Julius Kolbe (2 June 1855, Halle, Province of Westphalia – 26 November 1939) was a German entomologist from Halle, Westphalia. He was curator at the Berlin Zoological Museum from 1890 until 1921 specialising in Coleoptera, Psocoptera and Neuroptera. He died in Berlin-Lichterfelde.

Kolbe was born in Halle and studied at the University of Munster but did not complete due to problems with health and family. He worked as a teacher in Oeding from 1878 to 1882 and then joined the entomology department of the Zoologisches Museum at Berlin and became a curator of Coleoptera and Neuroptera in 1921. One of his interests was in the Scarabaeidae.

Works
Partial list:
Beziehungen unter der Arten von Poecilaspis (Cassididae) nebst Beschreibung einer von Herrn R. Rohde in Paraguay endeckten neuen Species dieser Gattung. Ent. Nachr., 13: 10-13 (1887).  
Beiträge zur Zoogeographie Westafrikas nebst einem Bericht über die während der Loango-Expedition von Herrn Dr. Falkenstein bei Chinchoxo gesammelten Coleoptera. Nova Acta Leop.-Carol. Deutsch. Akad. Naturf., 1, 3: 155-364 + 3 pl.(1887). (Also published as a book by E. Blochmann & Sohn, Dresden).
Eine von Herrn Dr. med. Drake in Paraguay entdeckte neue Canistra-art. Ent. Nachr., 13: 27 (1887).  
Käfer und Netzflüger Ost-Afrikas. In: K. Möbius (ed.), Deutsch-Ost-Afrika. Wissenschaftliche Forschungsresultate über Land und Leute unseres ostafrikanischen Schutzgebietes und der Angrenzenden Lä nder. Band IV. Die Thierwelt Ost-Afrikas und der Nachbargebiete. Wirbellose Thiere. Verlag Dietrich Reimer (Ernst Vohsen), Berlin (1898).

Collections
Museum für Naturkunde, Berlin
Westfälische Museum für Naturkunde 
Museum of Natural History at University of Wrocław

References

1855 births
1939 deaths
People from Halle (Westfalen)
German entomologists
Coleopterists
People from the Province of Westphalia